Lookout Mountain is a summit in the Santa Rosa Mountains in Riverside County, California.

References 

Mountains of Riverside County, California
Mountains of Southern California